Lua Blanco (born March 5, 1987) is a Brazilian actress, singer, songwriter, TV host, and model.
Blanco has been recognized for her talent, charisma and her ability to play different roles.
She achieved success on the telenovela Rebelde and as a member of its accompanying band, Rebeldes, which received one gold, two platinum, and one double-platinum album awards. Band members included Arthur Aguiar, Chay Suede, Micael Borges, Mel Fronckowiak and Sophia Abrahão. Lua performed about 90 shows over a span of three years, for a total of over 1.2 million spectators in Brazil.

During her career, she received nine nominations for the Shorty Awards, winning once as 'Vox Populi', for having the most nominations in the "Actress" category. Blanco was also voted the most suitable artist for all editions of Capricho Awards and was the only person to win all the categories in which she was nominated. In 2012, Blanco was voted the 71st-greatest Brazilian of all time, in a televised award ceremony; Lua was recognized as "a talent of the new generation." The program was intended "to elect who did more for the nation that stood out for his legacy to society."

Biography

Early life
Blanco is the daughter of musician Billy Blanco Junior and musician and English teacher Maria Claudia Blanco. She is the granddaughter of Billy Blanco, who was a successful bossa nova artist. Blanco was born in São Paulo and currently resides in Rio de Janeiro. She was raised in a large family of musicians; she has an older brother Pedro Sol and four younger siblings: Ana Terra, Estrela, Daniel, and Marisol. They were home-schooled by their mother in both English and Portuguese. The family moved often, including living in Peru for two years. The children entertained themselves with music and social projects.

She performed in musicals at a very young age in a band with her parents and siblings. Blanco and her siblings recorded an album called O Trem do Arco-Íris (The Rainbow Train), composed of children's songs in Portuguese and English.

Early career (2005–2006)
After recording a CD, Família Blanco – É Natal (It's Christmas) (2004), when Blanco turned 18, she and her family group began performing in bars and other small venues in Rio de Janeiro. Their repertoire consisted of bossa nova and The Beatles songs. In 2006, while in college, Blanco toured with her new band, Lágrima Flor (Flower's Tear), for which she was vocalist and composer. (The name of the band was a tribute to a song of her grandfather, introducing his work to a new generation.) After five years she left the band for other projects.

Theatre, television and film (2008–2010)

Blanco took courses to improve her talents: singing lessons with Professor Carol Savoy; Theatrical Interpretation at Casa de Cultura Laura Alvim, with Daniel Herz (2008–2009); Diving Theatre, the CAL course with Isaac Bernat, Claudia Melle and Renata Frisina (2009); Interpretation Workshop with Walter Lima to Cinema (2009); training workshop for Rebelde on TV Record, with Roberto Bomtempo (2010); workshop with the casting director Sergio Penna (2013).

Blanco began acting in 2008; her first stage role was Isolde in Romeu e Isolda.
That same year, she appeared in the Rede Globo telenovela Três Irmãs (Three Sisters), playing surfer Bia.

In 2009, Blanco returned to theater, cast as the character Mariana in the musical O Despertar da Primavera (Spring Awakening) by Frank Wedekind; the musical produced a Latin version revived by Charles Moeller and Cláudio Botelho. Among the three thousand auditioned, Blanco and her siblings Pedro Sol and Estrela were among the 19 finalists. In 2010, they released a soundtrack album for the musical. Blanco also played rock-musician Joe in the Globo telenovela Malhação and joined the cast of young presenters for TV Globinho.

In 2010, Blanco played Grace in the Globo telenovela As Aventuras do Didi (The Adventures of Didi). She re-recorded the hits "A Thousand Miles" by Vanessa Carlton and "Umbrella" by Rihanna, released on Relaxing Bossa – Volume 4. Blanco also came to rehearse for Natália in the play Confessions of a Teenager based on the book series of author Maria Mariana, but because of other commitments she could not continue in the show.

In the beginning of 2011, she debuted as Talia in the feature film Teus Olhos Meus (Soulbound ), which was directed and written by Caio Sóh.

Success in Rebelde (2011–2013)
Blanco became known for playing Roberta Messi, one of the protagonists on the Brazilian version of the telenovela Rebelde (Rebel ). Written by Margareth Boury and directed by Ivan Zettel, it was inspired by the eponymous Mexican telenovela by Pedro Damián. Auditions lasted four months and in late 2010, Blanco was chosen as one of the finalists. She completed a series of tests including acting, dancing, and singing to play the rebellious character Roberta. Rebelde portrayed the everyday life of young people living at a prestigious boarding school, facing typical teenage drama beyond the main storyline, such as alcoholism, bullying, eating disorders, and family problems. The telenovela premiered on March 21, 2011, and completed its final episode on October 12, 2012; the series was divided into two seasons and was broadcast in 410 episodes.

Blanco and the other five lead Rebelde actors – Arthur Aguiar, Chay Suede, Mel Fronckowiak, Micael Borges and Sophia Abrahão – were also the vocalists for the Rebeldes band. They were signed to Rede Record to tour and record along with TV series, and performed about 90 shows in Brazil over three years. The first Rebel Tour (October 30, 2011 – January 30, 2012) had shows conclude with Blanco singing "Firework" by Katy Perry for up to 90 thousand spectators. Following the telenovela's conclusion, the Farewell Tour Nada Pode Nos Parar (Nothing Can Stop Us) (January 30, 2012 – August 18, 2012) showed an audience demand that allowed for multiple tour extensions. They chose to perform ten days of concerts in the northeast, then launched the Turne Asepxia (Tour Asepxia) (August 25 – September 23, 2012). Lastly, the Rebels Forever Tour began in September 2012, revisiting cities for additional farewell concerts.

On September 23, 2011, the band's album Rebeldes was released, selling about 120,000 copies and earning platinum certification. The music video for the single "The Way I Am" was released in December of the same year.

Achievements with Rebeldes
In early 2012, the six lead actors recorded commercials for specialized products to combat pimples. Months afterwards when the ads aired, they learned that Asepxia was an official sponsor of the band.

On April 11, the band launched its first live album and DVD, Rebels Live, taken from show recordings in São Paulo. It sold 40,000 copies for gold certification, and a DVD equivalent of 50,000 copies for platinum. Together they yielded 140,000 copies. With the DVD they released a music video for the song "Nada Pode Nos Parar". In June, "After the Rain" became another hit single. On December 9, 2012, the band released a studio album, Meu Jeito, Seu Jeito (My Way, Your Way).

In 2012, Blanco appeared in the video "It was the Chosen" by her former band, Lágrima Flor, as an actress.

Rebeldes' final show was in Belo Horizonte on May 4, 2013.

2013–present
At the beginning of 2013, Blanco recorded a duet with singer João Teles of Pietros for "Todo Dia" (Every Day), released in April, and appeared in the music video. She made another duet with Rodrigo Fragoso, "Tudo Vai Mudar" (Everything Will Change).

In 2013, Blanco returned to theater in the role of Anne, a protagonist of the comedy Stand Up with Matheus Souza, who directed and wrote the play. The show was successful and extended for another season. In the same year, she participated in the musical As Coisas Que Fizemos e Não Fizemos (The Things We Did and Did not Do) as Paula, where she worked with actress Giselle Batista and Matheus Souza (who wrote and directed the show).

In July–August 2013, she made a cameo in the last two performances of Tudo por um Popstar (Everything for a Popstar) in Rio de Janeiro and three performances in São Paulo. The play portrayed the adventures of three friends who travel to the capital to watch the show of their biggest pop idols. Blanco took the stage with the cast to sing "I'm Yours" by Jason Mraz, a song and video she recorded with the Pietros band (who also attended), plus "Meu Jeito Seu Jeito" (My Way, Your Way) from the Rebeldes catalog.

Blanco recorded the song "Turnaround" for the film A Brasileira (The Brazilian). The film's producers were Uri Singer and Fabio Golombek, and starring actors included Fernanda Machado, Greg Tuculescu, Dean Cain, Mariel Hemingway, and Scott Rodgers.

Blanco returned to telenovelas in Pecado Mortal (Mortal Sin), which debuted on September 25, 2013. Blanco radically changed her look for the role due to the nature of the plot, the 1970s setting, and to better resemble the actor who played her character's mother.

Blanco directed a series pilot for a show called UO, featuring actors Miguel Romulo, Mariana Molina, Rael Barja, and Diego Montez.

In early 2014, Blanco was cast in Se Eu Fosse Você – O Musical (If I Were You – The Musical), a stage adaptation of the popular Brazilian film of the same name. Lua played Bia, the daughter of protagonists Helena (Claudia Netto) and Claudio (Nelson Freitas). It opened on March 21, in Rio de Janeiro, under the supervision of Daniel Filho, Flavio Marinho, direction and choreography by Alonso Barros, and musical direction by Guto Graça Mello.

In late 2014, Blanca began filming and recording for the feature Turbulência (Turbulence), a romantic comedy directed by Tiago Venâncio. She played Paula, one of the four protagonists, and recorded the song "Fall My Way" with singer Kevin White. The film was released on September 15, 2016.

On December 2, 2015, Blanco released the promotional single "Eu e o Tempo" ("Me and Time") and an autobiographical e-book to promote the release of her first solo album. She also sold collectibles in a campaign to promote and fund her tour. A second promotional single, "O Mundo Todo" (The Whole World), was released on December 25, and on February 27 the first official single "Perde Tudo" (Lose Everything). On March 5 (her 29th birthday), Blanco ended the campaign with 102% of her funding goal.

On March 21, Blanco sent fans who had supported her a digital version of her first studio album, Mão No Sonho (Hand In The Dream). The album includes the participation of her brothers in the song "Gosto do Amanhã", by fellow Rebeldes-member Micael Borges in "Vem Não Vem", and singer Gugu Peixoto, in the song "Tanto". Following the promotional tour, Blanco officially released Mão No Sonho on September 2, with a music video released on September 9.

Filmography

Theater

Discography

Awards and nominations

References

External links
 
 

1987 births
Living people
Actresses from São Paulo
Brazilian film actresses
Brazilian pop singers
Brazilian telenovela actresses
21st-century Brazilian singers
21st-century Brazilian women singers